Hopeaphenol is a stilbenoid. It is a resveratrol tetramer. It has been first isolated from Dipterocarpaceae like Shorea ovalis. It has also been isolated from wines from North Africa.

It shows an opposite effect to vitisin A on apoptosis of myocytes isolated from adult rat heart.

See also 
 Phenolic compounds in wine

References 

Resveratrol oligomers
Natural phenol tetramers
Wine chemistry